Denys Olehovych Bezborodko (born 31 May 1994) is a Ukrainian professional footballer currently playing as a forward for Kolos Kovalivka.

Career
From July 2015, he went on loan for the Ukrainian First League club FC Illichivets Mariupol.

Desna Chernihiv 
In summer 2017 he signed for Desna Chernihiv in the Ukrainian First League on loan from Shakhtar Donetsk. In the 2017–18 season, he scored 9 goals and was named Best Player of Round 32 and 34. In the 2018–19 season he helped the team stay up in the Ukrainian Premier League by scoring 5 goals. He ended his contract with Desna Chernihiv, having scored 27 goals in 45 appearances.

Oleksandriya 
In summer 2019 he moved to Oleksandriya in the Ukrainian Premier League. He helped the team to a 5th place finish in the 2019–20 season. He left the club in January 2021.

Return to Desna Chernihiv 
On 16 December 2020, he returned to Desna Chernihiv in the Ukrainian First League. He made his league debut against Dynamo Kyiv on 21 February 2021. On 3 April, he scored his first goal for Desna Chernihiv against Olimpik Donetsk.

He opened his 2021–22 account for Chernihiv on 9 August, scoring two goals against Inhulets Petrove and earning Player of the Week plaudits. On 14 August, he scored again, this time against SC Dnipro-1.

Loan to Gyirmót 
On 26 March 2022 he moved on loan to Gyirmót in Nemzeti Bajnokság I for three months. On 9 April 2022, he made his debut with the new club against Puskás Akadémia.

Loan to Zorya Luhansk 
On 29 July 2022 he signed a loan deal with Zorya Luhansk. On 4 and 11 August he played in 2022–23 UEFA Europa Conference League qualifying matches against Universitatea Craiova.

Kolos Kovalivka
In August 2022 he moved to Kolos Kovalivka.

International career
He was a member of the Ukraine under-20 side in November 2013.

Career statistics

Club

International

Honours
Desna Chernihiv
 Ukrainian First League: 2017–18

Zorya Luhansk
Ukrainian Cup: Runner-Up 2015–16

Individual
 Desna Chernihiv Player of the Year: (2) 2018, 2022
 Top Scorer Ukrainian youth championship: Runner Up 2014–15 (10 goals)
 Top Scorer Ukrainian Second League: Runner-up 2012–13 (13 goals)
 Best player round 3 Ukrainian Premier League: 2021-22
 Best player round 13 Ukrainian Premier League: 2018–19
 Best player round 32 Ukrainian First League: 2017–18
 Best Player round 34 Ukrainian First League: 2017–18

Gallery

References

External links
 Denys Bezborodko at koloskovalivka.com 
 
 
 

1994 births
Living people
Footballers from Chernihiv
Ukrainian footballers
Ukrainian expatriate footballers
Association football forwards
SDYuShOR Desna players
FC Shakhtar Donetsk players
FC Shakhtar-3 Donetsk players
FC Mariupol players
FC Zorya Luhansk players
FC Desna Chernihiv players
FC Oleksandriya players
Gyirmót FC Győr players
FC Kolos Kovalivka players
Ukrainian Premier League players
Ukrainian First League players
Ukrainian Second League players
Nemzeti Bajnokság I players
Expatriate footballers in Hungary
Ukrainian expatriate sportspeople in Hungary
Ukraine youth international footballers
Ukraine under-21 international footballers